The College of Psychologists of Ontario (CPO) is the regulatory college for the profession of psychology in Ontario, Canada. It sets the standards for the provision of psychological services by Psychologists and Psychological Associates.

The College maintains a register of all currently registered practitioners.

Profile

Through its committees, the College carries out various responsibilities, such as:

Setting requirements for entry to practice and administer the oral and written registration examinations
Registering qualified Psychologists and Psychological Associates
Setting and monitoring practice standards and ethical behaviour of the profession
Administering the Quality Assurance program and ensuring continued competence of the profession
Providing educational materials and information to the public and the profession regarding the practice of psychology
Investigating complaints and addressing concerns about the quality of service delivered that have not been resolved satisfactorily between the client and practitioner

Publications
The College publishes a bulletin quarterly “HeadLines”. The bulletin articles provide information about elections, changes within the council, regulation changes, amendments, and other current events relating to the College. A message from the current president is featured in the bulletin.  The College of Psychologists of Ontario also prepare an annual report detailing its activities and financial affairs, listed in it's References section.

Affiliate organizations

These are various organizations affiliated with the College of Psychologists of Ontario.
Association of Canadian Psychology Regulatory Organizations (ACPRO)
Association of State and Provincial Psychology Boards (ASPPB)

History
The College of Psychologists set the boundaries and standards that need to be met between psychologists and/or psychological associates and their client(s),.  These are outlined in the Standards of Professional Conduct. The College also provides steps that doctors need to take to protect a patient's privacy, in regards to Personal Health Information Protection Act, 2004 (PHIPA).

Founding
The College of Psychologists of Ontario (CPO) was established in 1960 through the Psychologists Registration Act, since amended. In Canada, it became the first psychology regulatory legislation. 

In 2010 the College celebrated the 50th anniversary of Psychology regulation in Ontario. The ceremony was attended by many former and current council members including Dr. Barbara Wand, Former Board member and chair, as well as Jack Schaffer, President of the Association of State and Provincial Psychology Board(ASPPB).

The Council
The Council of the College of Psychologists of Ontario is the governing body of the College. The Council sets policies and provides leadership and direction to the profession. There are 18 Council member positions: eight professional members elected by the profession from across the province, one being a non-voting member; three appointed academic members; and, a maximum of eight members of the public appointed by the provincial government. The Council meets four times a year and meetings are open to the public.

Prospective members
In Ontario, there are two regulated titles respecting the practice of psychology.  For the title psychologist, one requires a doctorate degree in psychology.  For the title psychological associate, one requires a master's degree in psychology and at least four years of relevant, post-master's degree experience.

For new applicants, each title consists of two types of certificates available according to Ontario Regulation 533/98, Registration.

 The Certificate Authorizing Supervised Practice is intended for persons who have not previously been registered for psychological service provision in any jurisdiction, or who have been registered less than five years in a jurisdiction where the requirements are not comparable to Ontario requirements; or
 The Certificate Authorizing Interim Autonomous Practice is intended for individuals:
Who are registered in a province or territory included in the Mutual Recognition Agreement (MRA); or,
Who are registered/licensed in a jurisdiction that is part of the Association of State and Provincial Psychology Board's (ASPPB) Agreement of Reciprocity; or
Who hold a Certificate of Professional Qualification (CPQ) granted by the Association of State and Provincial Psychology Board (ASPPB).

2023 action against member Jordan Peterson 
Jordan Peterson is a member of the College, professor of psychology, best selling author and prominent media commentator.

In January 2023, Peterson made public the college's order that he undergo social media communication coaching, following concerns about his public comments. Peterson denied any wrongdoing and filed for judicial review.

Prior to this, in February 2018, Peterson entered into a promise with the college after a professional misconduct complaint about his communication and the boundaries he sets with his patients. The college did not consider a full disciplinary hearing necessary and accepted Peterson entering into a three-month undertaking to work on prioritizing his practice and improving his patient communications. Peterson had no prior disciplinary punishments or restrictions on his clinical practice.

References

External links
 The College of Psychologists of Ontario

Medical and health organizations based in Ontario
Canadian psychologists
Ontario